Baron Chatfield, of Ditchling in the County of Sussex, was a title in the Peerage of the United Kingdom. It was created in 1937 for the naval commander Sir Ernle Chatfield. The title became extinct on the death of his son, the second Baron, in 2007 in Victoria, British Columbia, Canada.

Barons Chatfield (1937)
(Alfred) Ernle (Montacute) Chatfield, 1st Baron Chatfield (1873–1967)
Ernle David Lewis Chatfield, 2nd Baron Chatfield (1917–2007)

Notes

References
Kidd, Charles, Williamson, David (editors). Debrett's Peerage and Baronetage (1990 edition). New York: St Martin's Press, 1990, 

Extinct baronies in the Peerage of the United Kingdom
Noble titles created in 1937
Admirals of the Royal Navy